is the most recent Judo kata of Kodokan and was established in 1956. Compared to Kime no kata it is a more modern set of self-defence techniques. Instead of attacks with swords, the kata contains defences against attacks with stick and pistol.

The 21 techniques are named after and grouped by ukes attack. The first two groups are unarmed attacks (toshu no bu), from close distance when uke holds tori, and from a distance when uke punches or kicks. The last three groups are attacks with weapons (buki no bu): with a dagger, a stick and with a pistol.

Most of the techniques tori uses for defence are considered illegal in judo competitions (shiai) and randori, and are therefore not known to many judoka. Beside the strikes, the wrist locks kote-hineri and kote-gaeshi belong to those techniques, which are two common known aikido techniques.

Techniques 

 Unarmed attack
 When held
 Ryote-dori (Two-Hand Hold)
 Hidari-eri-dori (Left-lapel Hold)
 Migi-eri-dori (Right-lapel Hold)
 Kataude-dori (Single-Arm Hold)
 Ushiro-eri-dori (Collar Hold from Behind)
 Ushiro-jime (Choke from Behind)
 Kakae-dori (Seize and Hold from Behind)
 At a distance
 Naname-uchi (Slanting Strike)
 Ago-tsuki (Uppercut)
 Gammen-tsuki (Thrust-Punch to Face)
 Mae-geri (Front Kick)
 Yoko-geri (Side Kick)
 Armed attack
 Dagger
 Tsukkake (Thrust)
 Choku-tsuki (Straight Thrust)
 Naname-tsuki (Slanting Stab)
 Stick
 Furiage (Upswing)
 Furioroshi (Downswing)
 Morote-tsuki (Two-Hand Thrust)
 Pistol
 Shomen-zuke (Pistol at the Abdomen)
 Koshi-gamae (Pistol Held at the Side)
 Haimen-zuke (Pistol against the Back)

Sources 
 Jigoro Kano, Kodokan Judo, Kodansha International.
 Judo Info: Techniques with illustrative drawings.

External links
 Video of Goshin Jutsu from Poland.  Filmed in 2006.  No narration.
 Video of Goshin Jutsu by two experts from the Kodokan. Filmed in 2012 in Japan.

Judo kata